Tropaea or Tropaia was a town of ancient Arcadia, in the district Psophidia, on the Ladon. Its site is unlocated.

References

Populated places in ancient Arcadia
Former populated places in Greece
Lost ancient cities and towns